Joel Theophilus Afelokhai (born 7 April 1988) is a Nigerian professional footballer who plays as a goalkeeper. He is a multiple Nigeria Professional Football League title winner during a career in which he has played for Kano Pillars, Enyimba, and  Rivers United.

Career
Afekokhai joined Rivers United from Enyimba in 2020. He became the most paid footballer in the Nigeria Professional Football League. Such is his so-called “talismanic” ability for league titles it was joked in an interview with the Premium Times in July 2022 that he should join Manchester United Football Club in order to end their drought of success at the current moment in time.

Afelokhai has also represented his clubs in African continental competitions including both the CAF Champions League, and the CAF Confederation Cup.

Style of play
Not renowned as great with his feet from the back, Afelokhai has a good reputation for shot stopping and one-on-one save making.

International career
Afelokhai received his first call up to the Nigerian national football team in 2018 after an injury ruled out first choice Francis Uzoho. He was part of the Nigeria squad for the 2018 African Nations Championship, but was on the bench as they lost 4-0 in the final to Morocco at the Stade Mohammed V in Casablanca.

Honours
Winner

Kano Pillars
  NPFL: 2011-2012, 2012-2013, 2013–2014

Enyimba F.C.
 NPFL: 2019

Rivers United
 NPFL: 2021-2022

References

External links

1988 births
Living people
Nigerian footballers
Association football goalkeepers